Seme is a constituency in Kenya. It is one of seven constituencies in Kisumu County. The current Member of Parliament for Seme Constituency is the Honourable James Wambura Nyikal, who is its first-ever member of parliament ever since Seme was declared a constituency in 2012.

References 

Constituencies in Kisumu County